is a Japanese voice actress from Osaka, Japan.

Filmography

Anime

Bludgeoning Angel Dokuro-Chan as Tamiya-san (ep 5); Yuuko-sensei (ep 6,7)
D.C.S.S. ~Da Capo Second Season~ as Tamaki Konomiya
D.N.Angel as Miyuki Sawamura
Demonbane as Raika
Gakuen Utopia Manabi Straight! as Takako Kakuzawa
Kashimashi: Girl Meets Girl as Woman B (ep 2,3)
Koihime Musou as Kan'u Unchō/Aisha
Nishi no Yoki Majo - Astraea Testament as Literature Club Member 2 (ep 4); Woman A (ep 5)
La Corda d'Oro as Megumi Shouji
Shrine of the Morning Mist as Daughter (ep 18)
Seikon no Qwaser as Mutsumi Sendou
Sonic X as Frances
Soulcalibur IV as Scheherazade, Kamikirimusi
The World of Narue as Aya Kanazawa; Emcee (Ep. 10); [+ unlisted credits]
Wild Arms XF as Alexia Lynn Elesius
Yoake Mae Yori Ruri Iro Na as Sayaka Hozumi

Dubbing
Beyond the Sea (2004 film) as Sandra Dee (Kate Bosworth)
Wrong Turn 4: Bloody Beginnings as Bridget (Kaitlyn Wong)

Adult Games
Adult games are as follows.
 Pick Me, Honey

References

External links

Nami Kurokawa at pro-baobab.jp 
 Nami Kurokawa at GamePlaza-Haruka Voice Acting Database 
 Nami Kurokawa at Hitoshi Doi's Seiyuu Database 

Japanese voice actresses
Living people
1980 births